The Man from Toronto is a 1933 British romantic comedy film directed by Sinclair Hill and starring Jessie Matthews, Ian Hunter and Frederick Kerr. After an inheritance is left to them if they marry, an Englishwoman and a Canadian must meet for the first time to investigate the other - with comedic results. Matthews was considered a rising film star at the time of the production, and she quickly became one of Gainsborough Pictures' leading names.

Plot
Lawyer Bunston (Frederick Kerr) informs Englishwoman Leslie Farrar (Jessie Matthews), his niece by marriage, that she will inherit a quarter of a million if she marries Canadian Fergus Wimbush. The trouble is they have never met. Leslie is furious, certain that the deceased made the will to get back at her for not marrying him by pressuring her to wed his nephew. When Leslie refuses to comply with the condition, Bunston lets Mrs. Hubbard's cottage for Leslie, as she must cut down on her expenses.

When the man from Toronto comes to England, Leslie poses as a parlour maid in order to better make his acquaintance, and the two fall in love anyway. When he finally discovers her real identity, he is furious and refuses to marry her, but she persuades him to change his mind.

Cast
 Jessie Matthews as Leslie Farrar  
 Ian Hunter as Fergus Wimbush  
 Frederick Kerr as Bunston (as Fred Kerr)
 Margaret Yarde as Mrs. Hubbard
 Percy Parsons as Hogbin
 Kenneth Kove as Vicar
 Ben Field as Jonathan
 Kathleen Harrison as Martha
 Bill Shine as Butcher's Delivery Boy (as Billy Shine) 
 George Turner as Povey 
 Herbert Lomas as Jake  
 Laurence Hanray as Duncan  
 Sybil Grove as Vicar's Wife 
 George Zucco as Squire  
 George Benson as Villager (uncredited)
 Cyril Smith as Gossiping Villager (uncredited)

Production
Production began in July 1932. The film was shot at Islington Studios and on location at Amberley in Sussex. It was based on a play by Douglas Murray. The film's art direction was by Alex Vetchinsky.

Critical reception
TV Guide gave the film two out of five stars, calling it "A little charmer," and concluded that, "Kerr, as the lawyer, does his best to pair the two off and carries the weight of the picture while doing so."

References

Bibliography
Low, Rachael. Filmmaking in 1930s Britain. George Allen & Unwin, 1985.
 Richards, Jeffrey. The Age of the Dream Palace: Cinema and Society in 1930s Britain. I.B Tauris, 2010.
Wood, Linda. British Films, 1927–1939. British Film Institute, 1986.

External links
 

1933 films
1933 romantic comedy films
British black-and-white films
British romantic comedy films
Films directed by Sinclair Hill
Islington Studios films
Films set in England
Films set in London
Films shot in England
Gainsborough Pictures films
1930s English-language films
1930s British films